Mary Carol Flake de Flores (born September 25, 1950) is the former First Lady of the Republic of Honduras, wife of Carlos Roberto Flores Facussé, who was President from 1998 to 2002.

Biography
Mary Carol Flake was born in Memphis, Tennessee, the eldest of seven children, and was raised in Cincinnati, Ohio. She earned a bachelor's degree in textiles and marketing from Louisiana State University, where she met Carlos Roberto Flores Facussé. They married in 1973 and have two children: Mary Elizabeth Flores, since 2010 the Permanent Representative of Honduras to the United Nations, and Carlos David Flores Flake.

Her husband became involved in politics in the 1970s and was elected president in the 1997 general election, serving from January 1998 to January 2002.

As First Lady and after
As First Lady, Mary Flake de Flores was Honorary President of the Honduran Institute of Childhood and Family, participated in the Ninth Conference of Spouses of Heads of State and Government of the Americas, and participated in the summit of first ladies of Central America and the Inter-American Development Bank, to promote support for rural women. In 1998 she founded PROFUTURO, a project to build an interactive educational center and a children's museum of infancy. She is also the founder and honorary president of the Fundacion Hondura para el Niño con Cáncer (Honduran Foundation for Children with Cancer) and a member of the Board of Directors of the Honduran Institute of Interamerican Culture. She was Honorary President of the 1999 Special Olympics and keynote speaker at the 1999 National Congress for Women in Mexico City.

As founder and president of the non-profit Fundación María, she has organized and funded a new pediatric specialty hospital in Tegucigalpa, which began construction in 2000.

Honors 

 Nominated by the International Commission of Women for 1997 International Woman of the Year
 Medal of Merit of the Honduran Federation of Women Fellowship, for her humanitarian work during and after Hurricane Mitch, which severely damaged Honduras in October 1998.
 Caribbean Latin American Action Star of Caribbean Award, 1999
 2000 Humanitarian Award of the Sabin Vaccine Institute

References

Sources 
 "Mary Flake de Flores (Biografía)", Office of the First Lady of Honduras, Tegucigalpa, 2000 

People from Memphis, Tennessee
1950 births
First ladies of Honduras
Living people
Louisiana State University alumni
American emigrants to Honduras